Buđanovci (Serbian Cyrillic: Буђановци) is a village in Serbia. It is situated in the municipality of Ruma, Srem District, Vojvodina province. The village has a Serb ethnic majority and its population numbering 1,757 residents (2002 census).

History
The village received a brief worldwide fame when the Yugoslav army shot down a NATO F-117A stealth bomber near the village during the 1999 NATO bombing of Yugoslavia.

Historical population

Population of the village in various censuses:
1961: 2,392
1971: 2,260
1981: 1,991
1991: 1,848
2002: 1,757

See also
List of places in Serbia
List of cities, towns and villages in Vojvodina

References

External links
 Coat of Arms of Buđanovci

Populated places in Syrmia